Dedrick may refer to:


People

Surname
Jim Dedrick (born 1968), American Major League Baseball player
Rusty Dedrick (1918–2009), American swing and bop jazz trumpeter and composer
Zadock Dedrick or Zadoc Dederick, American inventor

Given name
Dedrick Dodge (born 1967), former American football safety
Dedrick Epps (born 1988), former American football tight end
Dedrick D. Gobert (1971–1994), American film actor
Paul Dedrick Gray (1972–2010), American musician, bassist, a backing vocalist, songwriter
Dedrick Harrington (born 1983), American football linebacker
Dedrick Martin Langve (1892–1959), American lawyer and politician
Mack 10, born Dedrick Rolison (1971), American rapper and actor
Dedrick Roper (born 1981), former American football linebacker

Places
Dedrick, California, a ghost town in Trinity County, California

See also